Haydn Porteous (born 8 July 1994) is a South African professional golfer.

Porteous won many amateur tournaments in South Africa, including the South African Stroke Play in 2012 and 2013. He was the top-ranked South African player when he turned professional in 2013.

Porteous has played on the Sunshine Tour and the Challenge Tour. He won the 2015 Barclays Kenya Open on the Challenge Tour.

In January 2016, Porteous won his maiden European Tour title with a two-stroke victory at the Joburg Open. This was a co-sanctioned event with the Sunshine Tour. Following Brandon Stone's win the previous week, Porteous' win was the second consecutive European Tour win by a South African first-time winner.

Amateur wins
2010 Free State and Northern Cape Open
2011 Boland Open
2012 South African Stroke Play, Boland Open Amateur, KwaZulu Natal Amateur, Limpopo Open, Harry Oppenheimer Trophy
2013 Prince's Grant Invitational, South African Stroke Play, Sanlam Cape Province Open, Boland Amateur Open
Source:

Professional wins (5)

European Tour wins (2)

1Co-sanctioned by the Sunshine Tour

Sunshine Tour wins (2)

1Co-sanctioned by the European Tour

Sunshine Tour playoff record (0–1)

Challenge Tour wins (1)

Challenge Tour playoff record (1–0)

IGT Pro Tour wins (1)

Results in major championships

CUT = missed the half-way cut
"T" = tied

Results in World Golf Championships

"T" = Tied

Team appearances
Eisenhower Trophy (representing South Africa): 2012

References

External links

South African male golfers
Sunshine Tour golfers
European Tour golfers
Golfers from Johannesburg
Alumni of St Stithians College
White South African people
1994 births
Living people